Chenar Faryab (also Romanized as Chenār Fāryāb, Chenār-e Fāryāb, and Chenār Fārīāb; also known as Chenār Pāryāb) is a village in Kuh Mareh Sorkhi Rural District, Arzhan District, Shiraz County, Fars Province, Iran. At the 2006 census, its population was 332, in 74 families.

References 

Populated places in Shiraz County